Hilal or Al-Hilal may refer to:

Hilal (hilāl), a crescent
 the crescent Moon visible after a new Moon, determining the beginning of a month in the Islamic calendar
 Banu Hilal, a confederation of tribes of Arabia

Arts and entertainment
 Al Hilal (film), a 1935 Urdu/Hindi costume drama film
 Al Hilal (1958 film), a 1958 Urdu/Hindi Bollywood film costume drama film 
 Al-Hilal (newspaper), a weekly Urdu newspaper 1912–1914
 Al-Hilal (magazine), a monthly Egyptian cultural and literature magazine

Businesses and organizations
 Al Hilal Bank, an Islamic bank in Abu Dhabi, United Arab Emirates
 Al-Hilal Stadium, a multi-use stadium in Omdurman, Sudan
 Al-Hilal English School, Manki, a not-for-profit school in Manki, Karnataka, India
 Red Crescent (emblem) (al-hilal al-ahmar), a symbol of the International Red Cross and Red Crescent Movement

People
 Hilal (given name)
 Hilal (surname)

Places
 Al Hilal (district), a district of Doha, Qatar
 Hilal (İzmir Metro), a metro station in İzmir

Sports
Al-Hilal (basketball), a professional basketball club in Riyadh, Saudi Arabia
Al-Hilal Tunis, a Tunisian women basketball club in the Arab Women's Club Basketball Championship
Al-Hilal SC (Benghazi, handball), a Libyan handball club in the African Handball Champions League
Al-Hilal (Bahrain), a Bahraini handball club in the Asian Club League Handball Championship
Al-Hilal (volleyball), a Saudi volleyball team in the 2007 and 2009 Asian Men's Club Volleyball Championship

Football
Al Hilal SFC, a Saudi Arabian professional multi-sports club
Al Hilal (Bahrain), a club in the 1997–2001 Bahraini Premier League
Al-Hilal SC (Benghazi), a Libyan club
Al-Hilal (Salalah), former name of Salalah SC, an Omani club
Al-Hilal Gaza, a Palestine club in the Gaza Strip Premier League
Al-Hilal Club (Omdurman), a Sudanese club
Al-Hilal ESC (Al-Fasher), a Sudanese club
Al-Hilal SC (Kadougli), a Sudanese club
Al-Hilal Al-Sahili, a Yemeni club
Al-Hilal FC (Juba), a South Sudanese club
Al-Hilal FC (Wau), a South Sudanese club
Al Hilal United FC, an Emirati club
El-Hilal SC El-Obeid, a Sudanese club in the Sudan Premier League
Hilal Alsahil SC, a Sudanese club

See also
 Hilaly
 Hilal-i-Imtiaz, a Pakistani award
 Hilal-i-Jur'at, a Pakistani award

Arabic words and phrases